Microcosm or macrocosm, also spelled mikrokosmos or makrokosmos, may refer to:

Philosophy
 Microcosm–macrocosm analogy, the view according to which there is a structural similarity between the human being and the cosmos

Music
 Macrocosm (album), seventh studio album by the German electronic composer Peter Frohmader, released in 1990
 Makrokosmos, a series of four volumes of pieces for piano by American composer George Crumb
 "Mic-rocosm", a song by American rapper Prodigy from the album Hegelian Dialectic
 Microcosm (album), 2010 album by Flow
 Microcosm (Bartok), 153 progressive piano pieces written between 1926 and 1939
 Microcosmos (Drudkh album)
 Microcosmos (Thy Catafalque album)
 Mikrokosmos (Bartók), a cycle of piano pieces written 1926-1939 by Hungarian composer Béla Bartók
 Mikrokosmos (Turovsky), four cycles of lute pieces, Mikrokosmos I-IV, by Ukrainian-American composer Roman Turovsky
 Mikrokosmos, pseudonym used by former Dark Star frontman Christian Hayes for solo material
 Mikrokosmos, a 1987 performance choreographed by Anne Teresa De Keersmaeker
 "Mikrokosmos", by BTS from the 2019 album Map of the Soul: Persona

Biology
 Microcosm (experimental ecosystem), a small scale contained and controlled ecosystem
Microcosmus, a genus of tunicates

Literature and publishing
 Microcosm Publishing, an independent publisher and distributor based in Portland, Oregon, and Bloomington, Indiana, U.S.
 Microcosm: E. coli and the New Science of Life, a 2008 book by Carl Zimmer
 Microcosm: Portrait of a Central European City, a 2002 book by Norman Davies and Roger Moorhouse
 Microcosm: The Quantum Revolution In Economics And Technology by George Gilder

Other uses
 Macrocosm (Star Trek: Voyager), 54th episode of Star Trek: Voyager
 Microcosm (CERN), a museum near Geneva, Switzerland
 Microcosm (clock), a unique clock made by Henry Bridges of Waltham Abbey, England
 Microcosm (hypermedia system), an early hypermedia system that predated the World Wide Web
 Microcosm (video game), a 1993 shoot-'em-up by Psygnosis
 Microcosm Ltd, a UK software protection company
 Micro-Cosmos: A Science Fiction Podcast 
 Microcosmos (film), a 1996 documentary film 
 The Microcosm, a 19th-century microscope gallery and shop on Regent Street, London, run by Carpenter and Westley

See also
 Microcosmic God, science fiction novelette published in 1941 by American writer Theodore Sturgeon
 Microcosmic orbit, a Taoist Qigong energy cultivation technique
 Microcosmic salt, a salt found in urine with the formula Na(NH4)HPO4
 Microcosmographia Academica, a short pamphlet on university politics written by F. M. Cornford and published in 1908
 The Ray of the Microcosm, romanticist poem written in 1845 by Prince-Bishop and Petar II Petrović-Njegoš